Super Best is the sixth compilation album by Japanese singer Shizuka Kudo. It was released on November 19, 1993, through Pony Canyon. It is Kudo's first single collection, featuring all A-sides produced by Tsugutoshi Gotō and released by Kudo since her solo debut, from "Kindan no Telepathy" up to the most recent at the time, "Anata Shika Inai Desho", spread out on two discs. The compilation also includes one new song, entitled "Honō no Naka e", which was written specifically for the album and which marks the last collaboration with Gotō until 2015, when he composed "Tan Jun Ai vs Hontō no Ai" for the compilation My Treasure Best: Miyuki Nakajima × Tsugutoshi Gotō Collection. Super Best was re-released in APO-CD format on December 1, 1993.

Commercial performance
Super Best debuted at number six on the Oricon Albums Chart, with 60,000 units sold. It dropped two positions to number eight on its second week, with 41,000 copies sold. The album charted in the top 100 for fourteen consecutive weeks, selling a reported total of 227,000 copies during its chart run. The re-release charted for a sole week at number 69 with 7,000 copies sold, bringing total sales of the album to 234,000 copies.

Track listing
All tracks composed by Tsugutoshi Gotō.

Charts

Standard edition

Re-issue edition

Certification

Release history

References

1993 compilation albums
Shizuka Kudo albums
Pony Canyon compilation albums